LBZ may refer to:

Leighton Buzzard railway station, Bedfordshire, National Rail station code
Lucapa Airport, Lucapa, Angola, IATA airport code